Taquara is a municipality in Rio Grande do Sul, Brazil. Taquara is located 72 kilometers (44 miles) from Porto Alegre, the state capital. Taquara's population was estimated at 57,584 in 2020.

References

Municipalities in Rio Grande do Sul